Bloody Disgusting is an American multi-media company, which began as a horror genre-focused news site/website specializing in information services that covered various horror medias, including: film, television, video games, comics, and music. The company expanded into other media including advertising, podcast networking, film, television, streaming media, and management.

The film production studio developed and produced the V/H/S franchise, a collection of six found footage films, two spin-off films, and one miniseries.

History 
Bloody Disgusting was founded in 2001 by Brad Miska (under the pseudonym "Mr. Disgusting") and Tom Owen, who run the site along with current managing editor John Squires. By 2007, the site had 1.5 million unique visitors and 20 million page views each month. In September 2007 a minority stake was purchased by The Collective, a Beverly Hills–based management company. In 2011 Bloody Disgusting began distributing and producing films that have gone on to win awards and spawned the successful V/H/S franchise.

In 2011, Bloody Disgusting partnered with The Collective and AMC Entertainment Holdings Inc.  to create a distribution company named Bloody Disgusting Selects. The new subsidiary specialized in providing a wider release for independent filmmakers. The company purchased distribution rights from movies that were initially released at film festivals, with locations at AMC Theatres handling exclusive theatrical release. After this, the movies were distributed by the conglomerate through The Collective's partnership with Vivendi Universal and on DVD, Blu-ray and VOD platforms.

Bloody Disgusting has notably worked on projects with genre writers, directors, and actors including, but not limited to: Adam Wingard, Simon Barrett, David Bruckner, Roxanne Benjamin, Joe Swanberg, AJ Bowen, Amy Seimetz, TI West, Radio Silence, Glenn McQuaid, Steven C Miller, Jonny Weston, Jason Eisner, Eduardo Sanchez, Greg Hale, Gareth Evans, Timo Tjahjanto, Marcel Sarmiento, Nacho Vigalondo, Patrick Horvath, Sion Sono, and Trent Haaga.

In October 2021, Cinedigm purchased Bloody Disgusting from co-owners/co-founders Brad Miska and Tom Owen, business partners Peter Lutrell and Heather Lutrell, and part-owner Michael Green who's company The Collective had previously owned a large stake in the company. Cinedigm intends to expand Bloody Disgusting on a large scale. In October 2021, Cinedigm assigned management of their subsidiary streaming service Screambox, to the Bloody Disgusting team. The collaboration will reinvent the streaming service, with intent to expand its content and original releases. In November 2022, the relaunch of the new "Bloody Disgusting approved" Screambox was announced. The streaming service included a redesign, change in cost, increase in variety of content, and accessibility changes. Upon its launch, the streamer included over 700 available titles. Bloody Disgusting's original streaming service, Bloody Disgusting TV, was moved into Screambox navigation.

Film production 
As Bloody Disgusting grew, it evolved into a film production company, releasing horror genre favorites and award-winning films.

 V/H/S – premiered at the 2012 Sundance Film Festival
 V/H/S/2 – premiered at the 2013 Sundance Film Festival
 V/H/S: Viral – premiered at the 2014 Fantastic Fest film festival
 V/H/S/94 – premiered at the 2021 Fantastic Fest film festival
 V/H/S/99 – premiered at the 2022 Toronto International Film Festival
 Under the Bed – premiered at the 2012 Fantasia International Film Festival
 A Horrible Way to Die –  premiered at the 2010 Toronto International Film Festival. It also played at Fantastic Fest where it received three major awards: Best Screenplay for Simon Barrett, Best Actor for AJ Bowen and Best Actress for Amy Seimetz.
 Southbound – premiered at the 2015 Toronto International Film Festival
 Honeydew – premiered at the 2020 Nightstream Film Festival

Bloody Disgusting Selects

 Alyce Kills
 Atrocious
 Blood Runs Cold
 Chop
 Cold Fish
 Crawl
 Delivery
 Exit Humanity
 Faust: Love of the Damned
 Fever Night aka Band of Satanic Outsiders
 The Haunting of Helena
 Hellacious Acres
 Macabre
 Outcast
 The Pack
 Phase 7
 Rammbock
 Truth or Dare
 The Woman
 YellowBrickRoad
 Terrifier 2

See also
 Blumhouse Productions
 Dark Castle Entertainment
 Ghost House Pictures
 Gold Circle Films
 Platinum Dunes
 Twisted Pictures

References

External links
 

Online mass media companies of the United States
American film websites
Horror fiction websites
Internet properties established in 2001
2001 establishments in the United States
Cinedigm